Giovanni Battista Barducci (died 1661) was a Roman Catholic prelate who served as Bishop of San Miniato (1656–1661).

Biography
On 17 Jun 1656, Giovanni Battista Barducci was appointed during the papacy of Pope Alexander VII as Bishop of San Miniato. He served as Bishop of San Miniato until his death on 17 Sep 1661.

References

External links and additional sources
 (for Chronology of Bishops) 
 (for Chronology of Bishops)  

17th-century Italian Roman Catholic bishops
Bishops appointed by Pope Alexander VII
1661 deaths